Clivina emarginata is a species of ground beetle in the subfamily Scaritinae, native to Australia. It was described by Jules Putzeys in 1868.

References

emarginata
Beetles described in 1868